This is a list of episodes for The Tonight Show with Jay Leno that aired from 2000 to 2009.

2000

January

February

March

April

May

June

July

August

September

October

November

December

2001

January

February

March

April

May

June

July

August

September

October

November

December

2002

January

February

March

April

May

June

July

August

September

October

November

December

2003

January

February

March

April

May

June

July

August

September

October

November

December

2004

January

February

March

April

May

June

July

August

September

October

November

December

2005

January

February

March

April

May

June

July

August

September

October

November

December

2006

January

February

March

April

May

June

July

August

September

October

November

December

2007

January

February

March

April

May

June

July

August

September

October

November

December

2008

January

February

March

April

May

June

July

August

September

October

November

December

2009

January

February

March

April

May

End of First Incarnation

References

Episodes
Tonight Show with Jay Leno
Tonight Show with Jay Leno